Nea Krini (Greek: Νέα Κρήνη, literally New Fountain) is a district of the municipality of Kalamaria, Thessaloniki regional unit, Greece. It was originally founded by Greek refugees from the city of Çeşme in Asia Minor. Historically, most of its residents were practising commercial fishing, although the importance of fishing in the area has been diminished.

Sport Clubs
In Nea Krini there are two major neighbouring football clubs, AE Nea Krini (Greek: Αθλητική Ένωση Νέας Κρήνης) and Agios Georgios (Greek: Αθλητική Ένωση Αγίου Γεωργίου Κρήνης).

External links
Official website

Populated places in Thessaloniki (regional unit)